Trait is the sole extended play by American industrial rock band Pailhead. The original EP was released in 1988, containing the first four songs in a slightly different order. When re-released on CD in the early 1990s, the group's first single ("I Will Refuse" b/w "No Bunny" 12") was added as a bonus.

Artwork
The album cover is an slightly altered photo of one of the tornadoes that formed above Austin, Texas during the 1922 Austin tornado outbreak.

Track listing

Original vinyl EP

Side One
 "Don't Stand in Line" – 3:47
 "Ballad" – 3:53

Side Two

 "Man Should Surrender" – 3:40
 "Anthem" – 4:45

CD

 "Man Should Surrender" – 3:40
 "Anthem" – 4:45
 "Don't Stand in Line" – 3:47
 "Ballad" – 3:53
 "I Will Refuse" – 4:17
 "No Bunny" – 5:00

Personnel
Ian MacKaye – vocals, guitar
Al Jourgensen – guitar
Paul Barker – bass
Bill Rieflin – drums (tracks 1–5)
Eric Spicer – drums (track 6)

References 

Albums produced by Al Jourgensen
1988 debut EPs
Wax Trax! Records albums